La Spezia Cathedral ("Cathedral of Christ King") is a Roman Catholic cathedral in La Spezia, Italy. It is the cathedral of the Diocese of La Spezia-Sarzana-Brugnato. It was built between 1956 and 1975 to designs by Adalberto Libera.

History
La Spezia became an episcopal seat in 1927, when Pope Pius XI created the new Diocese of La Spezia-Sarzana-Brugnato. The ancient church of the Abbey of Santa Maria Assunta was elevated to the status of pro-cathedral for the new diocese on 19 March 1929, but the project of the construction of a new cathedral was immediately set in motion. The chosen site was on a hilltop cleared at that time in order to link the historic districts in the centre of the town with those to the east, where previously had stood a Capuchin friary.

The project
A competition was announced, in which the winning entry was that of the architect Brenno Del Giudice, but the works were postponed by more than 25 years until the mid-1950s, and Del Giudice's designs were never implemented.

In the revived project of 1956, the Rationalist architect Adalberto Libera was chosen, who availed himself of the potential of the elevated site on the vast Piazza Europa to emphasise the monumentality of the religious building.

On the death of Libera in 1963, the building was still unfinished and its completion was entrusted to the local architect Cesare Galeazzi who resumed construction, incorporating some variations of his own. In 1975 the works were completed and the cathedral was consecrated and dedicated to Christ King of the Ages (Cristo Re dei Secoli).

Architecture
The exterior of the imposing structure is strongly characterised by its circular plan and by the external wall, in the shape of a hyperboloid of one sheet, without any openings. The large churchyard, in part a garden, faces uphill and onto it open three entrance portals.

The interior receives light from the opening in the centre of the vast cupola, with a diameter of 50 metres, supported by 12 massive columns symbolising the Apostles. A second source of light comes from a band of stained glass windows running around the perimeter of the main space. The pavement of white and grey marble, slightly sloping, converges towards the central altar of white marble, while the presbytery, paved in red marble, is slightly raised.

In the vaulted crypt are preserved the reliquary of San Venerio (Saint Venerius the Hermit) and the tombs of Itala Mela (a mystic of La Spezia) and of the first bishops of the diocese, Monsignor  (bishop from 1929 to 1943) and Monsignor  (1898-1989, bishop from 1943 to 1975); in a space adjoining the sacristy of the crypt is the tomb of the third bishop, Monsignor Siro Silvestri (1913-1997, bishop from 1975 to 1989).

Works of art
At the centre of the main space is a wooden crucifix of the 18th century. The altar, the ambo and the tabernacle of Carrara marble are all works of the sculptress Lia Godano. The baptistry, the choir, the pews and the confessional are to the designs of Cesare Galeazzi. The Deposition of Christ is a bronze by Angiolo Del Santo.

References

External links
 Architetturadelmoderno.it: Cattedrale i Cristo Re 
 Digilander.libero it - Adelberto Libera (pdf) 
 Geoplan.it Cattedrale di Cristo Re La Spezia 
 WelcomeSpezia.it Photos of the cathedral 
 LaSpeziaCronaca4.it, 15 May 2015 - I quarant'anni della cattedrale di Cristo Re

Bibliography
 P. Cevini: Le città della Liguria - La Spezia. Sagep:Genova 1984
 A. Alieri, M. Clerici, F. Palpacelli, G. Vaccaro: Adalberto Libera (1903-1963), in L'architettura. Cronache e storia, n anno XII n. 6, 1966

Roman Catholic cathedrals in Italy
Cathedrals in Liguria
Churches in the province of La Spezia
La Spezia
1975 establishments in Italy
Roman Catholic churches completed in 1975
20th-century Roman Catholic church buildings in Italy